Dante Marini (born July 21, 1992 in Chadds Ford, Pennsylvania) is an American former soccer player.

Career

College and youth
Marini played four years of college soccer at Northeastern University from 2010 to 2013. While at college, Marini appeared for USL PDL club Reading United AC.

Professional
Marini signed his first professional deal with USL Pro club Charleston Battery in March 2014. In April 2021, Marini indicated his retirement from professional soccer with a post on social media.

References

External links

 
 Huskies profile
 

1992 births
Living people
American soccer players
Northeastern Huskies men's soccer players
Reading United A.C. players
Charleston Battery players
Soccer players from Pennsylvania
USL League Two players
USL Championship players
Association football midfielders
People from Chadds Ford Township, Pennsylvania
Sportspeople from Delaware County, Pennsylvania